A high water mark is a point that represents the maximum rise of a body of water over land.

High water mark may also refer to:

High-water mark of the Confederacy, the turning point of the Battle of Gettysburg
High Water Mark of the Rebellion Monument, an 1892 Gettysburg Battlefield memorial
High water marks, used to determine hedge fund performance fees (see )
High-water mark (computer security), a computer security model wherein a document takes on the highest level of confidentiality allowed to the last person to access it

See also 
Watermark (disambiguation)
High Water (disambiguation)
 Highmark (disambiguation)